The 50th Anti-aircraft Missiles Regiment "Andrei Mureşianu" (Regimentul 50 Rachete Antiaeriene) is an air defense regiment of the Romanian Land Forces. It is currently subordinated to the 4th Infantry Division and its headquarters are located in Floreşti (near Cluj-Napoca). The regiment was part of the 6th Anti-aircraft Missiles Brigade, which was disbanded in 2006, during a reorganization of the Romanian Land Forces. The unit currently operates the SA-6 "KUB" and SA-8 "OSA-AKM" surface-to-air missile systems.

References

Regiments of Romania
Military units and formations established in 2002
2002 establishments in Romania
Air defence units and formations of the Romanian Army
Air defence regiments